A list of books and essays about Ingmar Bergman:

Bergman, Ingmar
Bibliography